José Yulo Yulo (September 24, 1894 – October 27, 1976) was the Chief Justice of the Supreme Court of the Philippines (May 7, 1942 – July 9, 1945) during the Japanese Occupation and was Speaker of the National Assembly of the Philippines from 1939 until World War II started in 1941. Yulo served in all of the branches of government: the legislative as House Speaker, congressman, and senator; the executive as Secretary of Justice and member of the Cabinet; and the judiciary as the Associate Justice and Chief Justice of the Supreme Court of the Philippines. He and his family also owned the Canlubang Sugar Estate that they bought in 1948.

Early life and career

José Yulo Yulo was born on September 24, 1894 in Bago, Negros Occidental to Sofronio Yulo and Segunda Yulo. He obtained his Bachelor of Laws degree at the University of the Philippines and placed third in the Philippine Bar Examination of 1913; however, due to his age, did not practice law until two years later. He became distinguished as one of the best corporation lawyers in the Philippines.

Appointed as Justice Secretary by Governor-General Frank Murphy and President Manuel L. Quezon in 1934 and 1935, he was elected to the National Assembly of the Philippines representing the province of Negros Occidental, becoming its Speaker under the ruling Nacionalista Party on its convening session in 1939.

The 1935 Philippine Constitution was amended in 1940 changing the unicameral legislature system into a bicameral system; thus the National Assembly was divided into a Senate and a House of Representatives. Yulo remained as Speaker of the National Assembly.

Yulo was elected to the Senate in 1941 for the 1st Congress of the Commonwealth of the Philippines but did not serve immediately as he was arrested by the US Army's Counter-Intelligence Corps (CIC) because he had worked in various capacities under the Japanese-sponsored Philippine Government. Following the Japanese conquest of the Philippines in 1942, he became a member of the Preparatory Committee for Philippine Independence, and upon the establishment of the Second Philippine Republic in 1943, was appointed Chief Justice of the Supreme Court. He is the only former Speaker of the House of Representatives of the Philippines to be subsequently appointed Chief Justice. He finally served his elected Senate term in 1945, lasting until 1946.

Accomplishments
Despite the difficulties experienced under Japanese occupation, Yulo attempted to maintain the integrity of the judiciary despite pressure from the Japanese military to sway in decisions on certain cases.

Postwar years
Yulo was the presidential candidate of the Liberal Party in the 1957 presidential election, eventually losing to incumbent President Carlos P. Garcia. His running mate, Pampanga's 1st district representative Diosdado Macapagal, won the vice-presidential race.

Yulo was later appointed by President Ferdinand Marcos as Secretary of Justice, and served from January 1, 1966 to August 4, 1967.

Death
Yulo died of respiratory failure as a result of atherosclerosis at Makati Medical Center in Makati at 10:10 AM on October 27, 1976. He was buried in Canlubang, Calamba, Laguna on October 30, 1976.

References

External links

Department of Justice of the Republic of the Philippines

1894 births
1976 deaths
Araneta family
Ateneo de Manila University alumni
Candidates in the 1957 Philippine presidential election
Chief justices of the Supreme Court of the Philippines
Deaths from respiratory failure
Filipino collaborators with Imperial Japan
Liberal Party (Philippines) politicians
People from Negros Occidental
Secretaries of Justice of the Philippines
Senators of the 1st Congress of the Commonwealth of the Philippines
Speakers of the House of Representatives of the Philippines
Members of the House of Representatives of the Philippines from Negros Occidental
University of the Philippines alumni
University of the Philippines College of Law alumni
Ferdinand Marcos administration cabinet members
Quezon administration cabinet members
Candidates in the 1953 Philippine vice-presidential election
Members of the National Assembly of the Philippines